Zira is a settlement and municipality in Baku, Azerbaijan.  It has a population of 11,053.

Sport 
Azerbaijani professional football club Zira based in Zirə. The club competes in the Azerbaijan Premier League.

References 

Populated places in Baku